Nitrous acid (molecular formula ) is a weak and monoprotic acid known only in solution, in the gas phase and in the form of nitrite salts.  Nitrous acid is used to make diazonium salts from amines.  The resulting diazonium salts are reagents in azo coupling reactions to give azo dyes.

Structure
In the gas phase, the planar nitrous acid molecule can adopt both a syn and an anti form. The anti form predominates at room temperature, and IR measurements indicate it is more stable by around 2.3 kJ/mol.

Preparation
Nitrous acid is usually generated by acidification of aqueous solutions of sodium nitrite with a mineral acid. The acidification is usually conducted at ice temperatures, and the HNO2 is consumed in situ.  Free nitrous acid is unstable and decomposes rapidly.

Nitrous acid can also be produced by dissolving dinitrogen trioxide in water according to the equation
 N2O3 + H2O → 2 HNO2

Reactions
Nitrous acid is the main chemphore in the Liebermann reagent, used to spot-test for alkaloids.

Decomposition

Gaseous nitrous acid, which is rarely encountered, decomposes into nitrogen dioxide, nitric oxide, and water:
2 HNO2 → NO2 + NO + H2O

Nitrogen dioxide disproportionates into nitric acid and nitrous acid in aqueous solution:

2 NO2 + H2O → HNO3 + HNO2

In warm or concentrated solutions, the overall reaction amounts to production of nitric acid, water, and nitric oxide:

3 HNO2 → HNO3 + 2 NO + H2O

The nitric oxide can subsequently be re-oxidized by air to nitric acid, making the overall reaction:

2 HNO2 + O2 → 2 HNO3

Reduction
With I− and Fe2+ ions, NO is formed:

 2 HNO2 + 2 KI + 2 H2SO4 → I2 + 2 NO + 2 H2O + 2 K2SO4
 2 HNO2 + 2 FeSO4 + 2 H2SO4 → Fe2(SO4)3 + 2 NO + 2 H2O + K2SO4

With Sn2+ ions, N2O is formed:

 2 HNO2 + 6 HCl + 2 SnCl2 → 2 SnCl4 + N2O + 3 H2O + 2 KCl

With SO2 gas, NH2OH is formed:

 2 HNO2 + 6 H2O + 4 SO2 → 3 H2SO4 + K2SO4 + 2 NH2OH

With Zn in alkali solution, NH3 is formed:

 5 H2O + KNO2 + 3 Zn → NH3 + KOH + 3 Zn(OH)2

With , both HN3 and (subsequently) N2 gas are formed:

 HNO2 + [N2H5]+ → HN3 + H2O + H3O+

 HNO2 + HN3 → N2O + N2 + H2O

Oxidation by nitrous acid has a kinetic control over thermodynamic control, this is best illustrated that dilute nitrous acid is able to oxidize I− to I2, but dilute nitric acid cannot.

 I2 + 2 e− ⇌ 2 I−  Eo = +0.54 V

  + 3 H+ + 2 e− ⇌ HNO2 + H2O  Eo = +0.93 V

 HNO2 + H+ + e− ⇌ NO + H2O  Eo = +0.98 V

It can be seen that the values of E for these reactions are similar, but nitric acid is a more powerful oxidizing agent. Base on the fact that dilute nitrous acid can oxidize iodide into iodine, it can be deduced that nitrous is a faster, rather than a more powerful, oxidizing agent than dilute nitric acid.

Organic chemistry
Nitrous acid is used to prepare diazonium salts:
HNO2  +  ArNH2  +  H+  →     +  2 H2O
where Ar is an aryl group.

Such salts are widely used in organic synthesis, e.g., for the Sandmeyer reaction and in the preparation azo dyes, brightly colored compounds that are the basis of a qualitative test for anilines. Nitrous acid is used to destroy toxic and potentially explosive sodium azide. For most purposes, nitrous acid is usually formed in situ by the action of mineral acid on sodium nitrite:
It is mainly blue in colour

 NaNO2 + HCl  →  HNO2  +  NaCl
 2 NaN3 + 2 HNO2  →   3 N2 + 2 NO + 2 NaOH

Reaction with two α-hydrogen atoms in ketones creates oximes, which may be further oxidized to a carboxylic acid, or reduced to form amines. This process is used in the commercial production of adipic acid.

Nitrous acid reacts rapidly with aliphatic alcohols to produce alkyl nitrites, which are potent vasodilators:

(CH3)2CHCH2CH2OH + HNO2 → (CH3)2CHCH2CH2ONO + H2O

The carcinogens called nitrosamines are produced, usually not intentionally, by the reaction of nitrous acid with secondary amines:
HNO2  +  R2NH  →  R2N-NO  +  H2O

Atmosphere of the Earth
Nitrous acid is involved in the ozone budget of the lower atmosphere, the troposphere. The heterogeneous reaction of nitric oxide (NO) and water produces nitrous acid. When this reaction takes place on the surface of atmospheric aerosols, the product readily photolyses to hydroxyl radicals.

See also

 Demjanov rearrangement
 Nitric acid (HNO3)
 Nitrosyl-O-hydroxide
 Tiffeneau-Demjanov rearrangement

References

Nitrogen oxoacids
Nitrogen cycle
Oxidizing agents
Mineral acids
Nitrogen(III) compounds